Nicolás Martín Tripichio (born 5 January 1996) is an Argentinian footballer who plays as a right-back for Defensa y Justicia in the Argentine Primera División.

Club career
Under Miguel Ángel Russo's coaching, Tripichio debuted professionally for Vélez Sarsfield in a 1–1 draw with Newell's Old Boys, in the 2015 Argentine Primera División. Although he mostly plays as a right full back, in that game he played as a left winger.

International career
Under Miguel Ángel Lemme's coaching, Tripichio took part of the Argentina national under-15 football team that finished third in the 2011 South American Under-15 Football Championship.

In 2013, the defender took part of the squad of the Argentina national under-17 football team that won the South American Under-17 Football Championship at home, under Humberto Grondona's coaching.

He also took part of the 2013 FIFA U-17 World Cup. Tripichio also won with the Argentina national under-20 football team the 2015 South American Youth Football Championship.

Honours
Argentina U-17
South American Under-17 Football Championship (1): 2013

Argentina U-20
South American Youth Football Championship (1): 2015

References

External links
Profile at Vélez Sarsfield's official website 

1996 births
Living people
Argentine people of Italian descent
Argentine footballers
Argentine expatriate footballers
Argentina youth international footballers
Argentina under-20 international footballers
Footballers from Buenos Aires
Association football fullbacks
Argentine Primera División players
Paraguayan Primera División players
Club Atlético Vélez Sarsfield footballers
Defensa y Justicia footballers
Club Guaraní players
Argentine expatriate sportspeople in Paraguay
Expatriate footballers in Paraguay